Idaho's Women of Influence is a database originally compiled in 2014 by researchers Annie Gaines and Mike Bullard. The women listed are considered by the university to be some of the most accomplished in Idaho's history. It is a living database continually updated by librarians, educators, museum staff, tribal authorities, women’s organizations.  The database is provided by the University of Idaho Library, and is open to credibly sourced submissions from the general public.   

This list is not to be confused with the East Idaho Women of Influence, sponsored by the East Idaho Business Journal and the Adams Publishing Group.

Inductees

References

External links
University of Idaho Library – Idaho's Women of Influence

Women in Idaho
Women in Idaho politics
Wikipedia missing topics